Arnold Abraham Goodman, Baron Goodman, CH, (21 August 191312 May 1995) was a British lawyer and political advisor.

Life
Arnold Goodman was born at Hackney, London, son of Jewish parents Joseph Goodman (1879/80-1940), a master draper, and Bertha (1887-1959), daughter of Joseph Mauerberger, owner of a Stepney drapery business. 
His first name was given on his birth certificate as "Aby", which was only corrected by his father in 1931. The Goodman family were comfortably prosperous, as Goodman described in profiles. He was educated at Hackney Downs School (formerly The Grocers' Company School), University College London, and Downing College, Cambridge. He became a leading London lawyer as Senior Partner in the law firm Goodman, Derrick & Co (now Goodman Derrick LLP). He was solicitor and advisor to politicians such as Harold Wilson.

Lord Goodman was chairman of the Arts Council of Great Britain from 1965 until 1972, succeeded by Lord Gibson. As chair of the Arts Council, Goodman managed the organisation's 'golden age' with the establishing of the South Bank Centre and adoption of the only UK government bill for the Arts while the Council began regular funding for a number of galleries and theatre companies in the English regions. He was also chairman of British Lion Films, the Committee of Inquiry into Charity Law, the Committee on London Orchestras, the Housing Corporation, the National Building Agency, the Newspaper Proprietors' Association, and The Observer Trust, as well as being Director of the Royal Opera House and Sadler's Wells, Governor of the Royal Shakespeare Theatre, a member of the Planning Committee for the Open University and President of the Theatrical Advisory Committee. He was a Senior Fellow of the Royal College of Art and an Honorary Fellow of the Royal College of Art. He was also a founder and patron of the Next Century Foundation. He was awarded an Honorary Degree (Doctor of Laws) by the University of Bath in 1976. On 7 November of the same year, he formally opened the British Music Information Centre (BMIC).

Publisher Rupert Hart-Davis was a client when Goodman was a partner in Rubenstein Nash; Goodman reached an agreement with Winston Churchill and Lord Beaverbrook over G. M. Young's life of Stanley Baldwin in 1952, though it required the "hideously expensive" job of removing and replacing seven leaves with revised wording in 7,580 copies of the book. In 1963, Goodman (now in his own firm, Goodman Derrick) arranged for Granada Television to take over Hart-Davis's loss-making publishing firm and Hart-Davis "wasn't surprised when he became a leading trouble-shooter for the government". After hearing details of the firm's finances for ten or fifteen minutes Goodman dictated everything back to his secretary: "the most amazing feat of mental agility I've ever seen or heard of".

In 1977, Goodman founded the Motability scheme for disabled motorists.

Later in his career, Lord Goodman was Master of University College, Oxford, succeeding Lord Redcliffe-Maud in 1976. He retired from the post in 1986 and died from pneumonia on 12 May 1995.

Arnold Goodman was created a life peer as Baron Goodman, of the City of Westminster in 1965 and sat as a Crossbencher. He was made a Companion of Honour in 1972.

Criticisms
After Goodman's death one of his wealthy clients, Lord Portman alleged that Goodman stole funds worth £10 million from his family's trust over a 30-year period and made donations to the Labour Party. Portman commenced legal proceedings for recovery but the claim was never substantiated, and the research of Goodman's biographer concluded that it had no substance.

Goodman was often portrayed by Private Eye as a sinister "power behind the throne" exerting huge influence on the British establishment. Private Eye often referred to him as Lord "Two Dinners" Goodman, a reference to his girth.

According to a documentary made by Richard Bond for Channel 4, The Gangster and the Pervert Peer, screened on 16 February 2009, Goodman, who never married, was one of the chief parties responsible for suppressing investigations by journalists which exposed how Lord Boothby and others were responsible for protecting the Krays from justice. Official MI5 records declassified on 22 October 2015 revealed that the association between the bisexual Boothby and the Kray twins had been the subject of an MI5 investigation in 1964.

Arms

Publications
 Not For the Record selected speeches and writings (1972).

Offices held

References

Sources
The Oxford Dictionary of National Biography (includes photograph)
Goodman's obituary in the Galton Institute
Criticism of Goodman
Goodman's obituary in The New York Times
Goodman allegations, The Guardian
Goodman commentary, Times Higher Education

External links

 Lord Goodman – The Daily Telegraph obituary
 Biography of Goodman by Brian Brivati
 Goodman Derrick LLP
Parliamentary Archives, Papers of Baron Goodman

1913 births
1995 deaths
Alumni of Downing College, Cambridge
Alumni of University College London
People educated at Hackney Downs School
British Jews
British King's Counsel
English solicitors
Crossbench life peers
Masters of University College, Oxford
Members of the Order of the Companions of Honour
People associated with the Royal College of Art
20th-century British lawyers
Jewish British politicians
Honorary King's Counsel
Burials at Liberal Jewish Cemetery, Willesden
20th-century English lawyers
Life peers created by Elizabeth II